Python-Ogre is a Python binding for the OGRE 3D engine, designed to provide the functionality and performance of OGRE (written in C++) with the accessibility and ease of use of Python to facilitate the rapid development of 3D games and to make the OGRE engine more accessible to the beginner, who might otherwise be daunted by the technicalities of writing in the native C++. The performance of the engine is decreased in comparison to the original C++ demos, however the original OGRE engine provides such high performance that the performance of Python-Ogre is still more than acceptable for all but the most graphics-intensive games.

Features 
Python-Ogre is different from the Ogre3D engine it is based upon as it comes pre-bundled with Python bindings and demos for many other support libraries.

Compatibility 
Python-Ogre has compatibility for all platforms supported by OGRE:
 Microsoft Windows - Binaries are available at the Python-Ogre forums.
 Linux - Build instructions can be found on the Python-Ogre wiki. An Ubuntu binary is currently in development.
 Mac OS X - Build instructions can be found on the Python-Ogre wiki. Python-Ogre builds on both Mac OS X 10.4 “Tiger” and Mac OS X 10.5 “Leopard”.

Support 
The Python-Ogre wiki, contains build instructions for Windows, Linux, and Mac OS X platforms, as well as tutorials and example code snippets.

Ogre3D hosts the official Python-Ogre forum for helping developers in their use of the engine.

History 
The PyOgre project began in early 2005, where a Python binding for OGRE was first attempted using Boost.Python from the Boost C++ Libraries by two members of the Ogre3D community, Clay Culver and Federico Di Gergorio. This effort ultimately failed, which prompted the use of SWIG as the basis for the C++ binding. This method proved to be rather successful, providing to the community with a somewhat limited and error-prone implementation, but an implementation nonetheless.

In mid-2006, Lakin Wecker began work on Python-Ogre, based on the Boost.Python libraries, as was attempted before. This was developed alongside the PyOgre project. He was aided by Andy Miller, who then later took over development of the project with assistance from Roman Yakovenko, Joseph Lisee, and Ben Harling during the evolution of the engine.

Development of PyOgre was halted in mid-2007, and officially succeeded by Python-Ogre.

As of summer of 2008, Andy Miller was actively working on adding new features to Python-Ogre, as well as providing support and maintenance.

As of January 2014, the main website at python-ogre.org went offline, but wiki.python-ogre.org is still extant.

Included libraries 
The following libraries are either currently supported, or have at one point in time worked with the Python-Ogre engine. Support for particular libraries are noted in each release. Demos are available for all libraries listed, however, not all demos function, due to the constantly evolving codebase and limited number of active developers.

 Renderer
 Ogre 1.4.9 Legacy version
 Ogre 1.5 "Shoggoth" experimental software build
 Ogre 1.6 official release
 Ogre 1.7 "Cthugha" experimental build, including full DirectX 10 support.
 GUI
 BetaGUI—Compact and lightweight OGRE GUI library
 CEGUI—Fully featured general-purpose videogame GUI library
 Navi—HTML/CSS/JS-based OGRE GUI library
 QuickGUI—Easy to use, widget-based OGRE GUI library
 Hikari—Flash based OGRE GUI library
 I/O
 OIS—Standard OGRE input library, allowing buffered, object-oriented input
 Audio
 OpenAL—Cross-platform audio API commonly used with Ogre3D
 Physics
 Bullet—Full-featured physics engine with a feature set similar to that of proprietary libraries, offering both rigid body and soft body collision detection
 ODE—Open source rigid body collision detection library
 Newton—Offers real-world physics simulation, where accuracy and real-world physical parameters are desired over performance and newer features
 PhysX—Popular, proprietary, high performance, fully featured library
 NxOgre—Wrapper for the PhysX library and Ogre3D, with an editor and other helpful Ogre3D-oriented features
 Effects
 Particle Universe—Scriptable particle effects engine that helps create complex particle effects easily
 Caelum—Realistic sky, atmosphere, weather and lighting simulation
 LibNoise—Portable, open-source, coherent noise-generating library

References

External links
 Python-Ogre wiki
 Downloads from SourceForge
 Archive of Python-Ogre.org
 Official Python-Ogre forum
 Python-Ogre Google Group
 Ohloh page

Free 3D graphics software
Free computer libraries
Python (programming language) libraries
Python (programming language)-scriptable game engines